Shatin Pass Road is a road in the Wong Tai Sin District of Kowloon, Hong Kong, linking the Wong Tai Sin area in the south to the junction of Fei Ngo Shan Road and Jat's Incline in the north. Along the way, it passes through the Tsz Wan Shan area and Sha Tin Pass.

The northern part of Shatin Pass Road, between Sha Tin Pass and the junction of Fei Ngo Shan Road and Jat's Incline, is part of the Stage 4 of the Wilson Trail and Section 5 of the MacLehose Trail. This section of the road also marks the border between Sha Tin District and Wong Tai Sin District.

History
Shatin Pass Road was built by the British Army to access Sha Tin Pass and some village in Sha Tin District from Kowloon.

The road was damaged by a storm in June 2008, that caused a landslide. It reopened in December, 2008

Features along the road
In alphabetic order:
 Chuk Yuen (North) Estate
 Fat Jong Temple
 Lions Pavilion at Sha Tin Pass
 Lower Wong Tai Sin Estate
 Muk Lun Street Playground
 Our Lady of Maryknoll Hospital
 Our Lady's College
 Sha Tin Pass
 Sha Tin Pass Estate (沙田坳邨)
 SKH Calvary Church
 Tsz Lok Estate
 Tung Wah Group of Hospitals Wong Tai Sin Hospital
 Wong Tai Sin Police Station
 Ying Fuk Court

Roads in New Kowloon
Tsz Wan Shan
Wong Tai Sin
Sha Tin District